The 2018 Currie Cup First Division was the second tier of the 2018 Currie Cup, the 80th edition of the annual South African rugby union competition organised by the South African Rugby Union. It was played between 24 August and 19 October 2018 and featured seven of the eight teams that played in 2017, following Namibian side ' withdrawal.

Competition rules and information

There were seven participating teams in the 2018 Currie Cup First Division. They played each other once during the pool stage, either at home or away. Teams receive four points for a win and two points for a draw. Bonus points were awarded to teams that scored four or more tries in a game, as well as to teams that lost a match by seven points or less. Teams were ranked by log points, then points difference (points scored less points conceded).

The top four teams in the pool stage qualified for the semifinals, which were followed by a final.

Financial crisis and withdrawal of Welwitschias

The start of the 2018 Currie Cup First Division was marred by financial problems following the South African Rugby Union's announcement that First Division teams' budgets would be cut by 52%. Namibian side  were informed that they would have to pay the travel costs for teams travelling to games in Windhoek, but — after initial reports indicated that they raised the money with the help of World Rugby — they could not raise the required funds and announced their withdrawal from the competition.

Teams

The teams that played in the 2018 Currie Cup First Division are:

Pool stage

Standings
The final log for the 2018 Currie Cup First Division was:

Round-by-round

The table below shows a team's progression throughout the season. For each round, each team's cumulative points total is shown with the overall log position in brackets.

Matches

The following matches were played in the 2018 Currie Cup First Division:

Round One

Round Two

For the second match in succession, Friedle Olivier and Etienne Taljaard each scored two tries for the Falcons, while a hat-trick from prop Danie van der Merwe was not enough for the team from Welkom. The  kept in touch with the Falcons, securing their second win of the competition after beating the  35–12 in Potchefstroom, while the  outscored the  37–22 in East London, with three players – Ruben Schoeman and Marlo Weich for the SWD Eagles and Sonwabiso Mqalo for the Border Bulldogs – getting two tries in the match.

Round Three

Defending champions the  suffered their second loss in a row, being beaten 7–32 by a  side for whom Marlo Weich scored two tries for the second match in a row, moving into second place on the log in the process. The weekend's other match saw the  beat the  24–17 in Bredasdorp in their first victory of the season.

Round Four

The  kept up the pressure by also securing a narrow away win, beating the  48–45 in Welkom, with Charlie Mayeza scoring two tries and Elgar Watts contributing 15 points in the match for the visitors, while a hat-trick for Japie Nel and a brace for Cody Basson was in vain for the home side.

Round Five

The  returned to the top of the log after beating the  47–22, with fullback Gerhard Nortier scoring two tries for the team from Potchefstroom.

Round Six

Seven different players scored tries for the home side, with fly-half Divan Nel contributing 19 points with the boot, while a brace from loose forward Tapiwa Tsomondo was in vain for the away side. Three players scored two tries each in the match — Tertius Maarman and Barend Potgieter for the Griffons and Gerhard Nortier for the Leopards — as the Griffons maintained their play-off push by moving up to fifth spot. Winger Etienne Taljaard scored four tries for the Falcons, with Coert Cronjé, Thabo Mabuza and Friedle Olivier getting two each, while scrumhalf Anrich Richter converted 11 of his side's tries.

Round Seven

In the first match of the weekend, the  leap-frogged the  into second place on the log after winning the match between the teams 41–35, securing a home semifinal against the same opposition. Anrich Richter contributed 18 points for the home team, while a hat-trick for visiting winger Dean Stokes proved futile. The  secured top spot after a 36–7 win over bottom-of-the-log , with winger Adri Jacobs scoring two tries, and being awarded to penalty tries in the match.

Play-offs

Title play-offs

Semifinals

Final

The  won their third Currie Cup First Division title — following on from wins in 2002 and 2007 — by beating the  36–27 in George, despite being 15–27 down as half-time. Eighth man Wayne Wilschut scored a hat-trick of tries for the home team, with Wynand Grassmann and Marlo Weich getting one each, and Divan Nel kicking 11 points. For the Falcons, Etienne Taljaard scored two more tries to finish as the competition's top try-scorer with 13 tries, while Anrich Richter scored a try and 12 points with the boot to finish as the top points scorer with 105.

Promotion play-off

Honours

The honour roll for the 2018 Currie Cup First Division was as follows:

Players

The squads and player appearance and scoring statistics for the 2018 Currie Cup First Division are as follows:

Referees

The following referees officiated matches in the 2018 Currie Cup First Division:

See also

 2018 Currie Cup Premier Division
 2018 Rugby Challenge

References

External links
 SARU website

2018 Currie Cup
2018
2018 in South African rugby union
2018 rugby union tournaments for clubs